Raybon is both a given name and a surname. Notable people with the name include:

Israel Raybon (born 1973), American football player
Marty Raybon (born 1959), American musician
Patricia Raybon, American journalist
Raybon Kan (born 1966), New Zealand comedian and newspaper columnist